The 2017–18 season was Irish provincial rugby union side Connacht Rugby's seventeenth season competing in the Pro14, and the team's twenty-second season as a professional side. It was Kieran Keane's first and only season in charge of the side.

Connacht finished sixth in their seven-team Pro14 conference. As well as playing in the Pro14, the team competed in the Challenge Cup in Europe. They finished first in their pool and advanced to the knockout stage as third seed overall, but were defeated at home by Gloucester in the quarter-finals. The second tier side the Connacht Eagles competed in the 2017–18 British and Irish Cup, finishing third in their pool.

Background

Competition schedule
On 30 June 2017, BBC Wales reported that the two South African teams being dropped from the Super Rugby competition, the Cheetahs and Southern Kings, would be immediately added to Pro12. Their involvement was confirmed on 1 August 2017. The 14 teams were split into two conferences of seven, with each conference featuring two teams each from Ireland and Wales and one team each from Italy, Scotland and South Africa. Connacht were named in Conference A. It was announced that each team would play the other teams in their own conference twice and those in the other conference once. In addition, Connacht would have two additional derby games against Leinster and Ulster, the Irish provinces in Conference B.

Connacht were entered into the Challenge Cup in Europe, following a play-off defeat to Northampton Saints. The team was drawn in Pool 5 of the competition along with Brive, Worcester Warriors and Oyonnax.

Personnel changes
In February 2017, Connacht announced that New Zealander Kieran Keane, Chiefs attack coach, had signed a three-year contract to become their new head coach, replacing Pat Lam who moved to Bristol. Following Keane's appointment, existing forwards coach Jimmy Duffy signed an extension to his deal and academy manager Nigel Carolan was promoted to backs coach, leaving his post as head coach of the Ireland under-20s to take the role. In May 2017, Peter Wilkins joined from Edinburgh as defence coach.

Among the prominent departures from the first team squad were Irish international scrum-half John Cooney, who joined Ulster, long-serving prop Ronan Loughney, who retired, and former Springbok Marnitz Boshoff, who departed a year earlier than initially planned for personal reasons. Incoming players included Australian flanker Jarrad Butler and prop Peter McCabe, who had previously been on loan with the team. The team also agreed a deal to sign  international Eroni Vasiteri, but the move was called off after he received a nine-week ban for gouging. All Blacks Sevens player Pita Ahki was signed as a replacement.

Coaching and management team
Note: Flags indicate national union as has been defined under WR eligibility rules. Individuals may hold more than one non-WR nationality.

Players

Senior playing squad
The Connacht senior squad for 2017–18 was:

 Senior 15's internationally capped players in bold
 Irish Provinces are currently limited to four non-Irish eligible (NIE) players and one non-Irish qualified player (NIQ or "Project Player"). Connacht is exempted from this under a separate development arrangement.

Academy squad
The Connacht academy squad for 2017–18 was:

Senior team transfers

Players in
HK  Pat O'Toole promoted from academy
PR  Denis Coulson from  Grenoble
PR  Peter McCabe from  Munster
LK  Gavin Thornbury from  Wanganui
FL  Jarrad Butler from  Brumbies
SH  Conor McKeon promoted from academy
SH  James Mitchell from  Sale Sharks
FH  Andrew Deegan from  Waratahs
CE  Pita Ahki from 
WG  Cormac Brennan promoted from academy
WG  Rory Scholes from  Edinburgh

Players out
PR  Ronan Loughney retired
PR  Ivan Soroka to  Clontarf
LK  Ben Marshall retired
LK  Danny Qualter to  Nottingham
LK  Lewis Stevenson to  Bangor
FL  Nepia Fox-Matamua to  Ponsonby
FL  Rory Moloney to  Thames Valley
SH  John Cooney to  Ulster
FH  Marnitz Boshoff to  Blue Bulls
FH  Shane O'Leary to  Ealing Trailfinders
CE  Rory Parata to  Otago
WG  Danie Poolman to  Buccaneers
FB  Josh Rowland to  Ireland Sevens

Playing kit
The official Connacht team and support staff kit supplier for the season was Australian manufacturer BLK sport, who had supplied the full range of apparel for all of Connacht Rugby's representative teams and support staff since 2013. Connacht's main shirt sponsors were Irish sporting retailer Intersport Elverys, in the second year of a three-year deal.

Connacht launched their new home kit for the season in July 2017, in the traditional green. The team launched new away and European kits in August 2017 during a pre-season friendly against former head coach Pat Lam's side Bristol, wearing the away kit in the first half and the European kit in the second half. The away kit was primarily cyan and white, with white shorts and socks, while the European kit was primarily blue and lime green, with blue shorts and lime green socks.

Results

Pro14

Challenge Cup

Pool 5

Pool winners and runners-up rankings

Quarter-finals

References

Connacht Rugby seasons